Glen Dale Woodall was a victim of a miscarriage of justice in West Virginia.  He was an itinerant gravedigger and handyman, who was sent to prison for a crime that DNA evidence has subsequently cleared him of.

Samples of his blood were sent to the state crime lab and were matched to multiple sexual assaults at the Huntington Mall by state crime lab serology expert Fred Zain.  In 1987, Woodall was found guilty in Cabell County Circuit Court, sentenced to 335 years in prison and sent to the West Virginia State Penitentiary in Moundsville to serve his sentence.  In 1992 Woodall was found to be innocent and to have been convicted on false evidence. Zain was subsequently found to have participated in the "framing" of hundreds of persons, and the West Virginia Supreme Court ordered new trials.

Woodall then settled with the state, receiving the maximum damages allowed by law, and moved to Florida.

See also
List of wrongful convictions in the United States

References

External links

WSAZ

Overturned convictions in the United States
Living people
American people wrongfully convicted of murder
Year of birth missing (living people)